Leise Maersk is the name for a number of ships that served with the Maersk Line.

  (1921–1940) First diesel-powered cargo ship for Maersk Line
  (1942–1972) Cargo ship, renamed in 1966 first as Brigantine and then Mitera Irene. Renamed as Camina Bay in 1969. Scapped in Bruges in 1972
  (1967–) Tanker, renamed in 1976 as Navios Patriot, in 1981 as Good Horizon and in 1984 as Bright
  (1980–1995) Container ship for Maersk Line. Purchased by United States Navy in 1995 and converted to roll-on/roll-off ship and renamed as USNS Yano in 1997

References

Merchant ships of Denmark
Ships of Maersk
Ship names